Hejrat may refer to:
 Hejrat, Fars
 Hejrat, Golestan
 Hejrat, Kohgiluyeh and Boyer-Ahmad
 A song by Iranian singer Googoosh